Weider is a German surname. Notable people with the surname include:

Ben Weider (1923–2008), co-founder of the International Federation of BodyBuilding & Fitness.
Jim Weider, guitarist
John Weider (born 1947), rock musician
Joe Weider (1919–2013), Canadian bodybuilder and key developer of the profession
Wolfgang Weider (born 1932), German auxiliary bishop, Archbishop of Berlin

German-language surnames